Thelcticopis is a genus of huntsman spiders that occurs almost exclusively in the area India to Japan to New Guinea and Fiji. However, one species (T. pestai) occurs in Costa Rica, and another (T. humilithorax) in Congo basin, although the latter species is probably misplaced in this genus.

This genus is distinguished by the abdomen narrowing behind and ending in terminal spinnerets which are borne on a tubular stalk separated at the base by a membranous ring. They are often brownish-red, the abdomen is either of uniform color or shows paired spots. However, some species are black, yellow or green.

Species
As of November 2022 it contains 51 species:
 Thelcticopis ajax Pocock, 1901 — India
 Thelcticopis ancorum Dyal, 1935 — Pakistan
 Thelcticopis bicornuta Pocock, 1901 — India
 Thelcticopis bifasciata Thorell, 1891 — Nicobar Islands
 Thelcticopis biroi Kolosváry, 1934 — New Guinea
 Thelcticopis buu (Logunov & Jäger, 2015) — Vietnam
 Thelcticopis canescens Simon, 1887 — Andaman Islands, Myanmar
 Thelcticopis celebesiana Merian, 1911 — Sulawesi
 Thelcticopis convoluticola Strand, 1911 — Aru Islands
 Thelcticopis cuneisignata Chrysanthus, 1965 — New Guinea
 Thelcticopis dahanensis (Zhu & Zhong, 2020) — Taiwan
 Thelcticopis fasciata Thorell, 1897 — Myanmar
 Thelcticopis flavipes Pocock, 1897 — Moluccas
 Thelcticopis folia Jäger & Praxaysombath, 2009 — Laos
 Thelcticopis goramensis Thorell, 1881 — Malaysia
 Thelcticopis hercules Pocock, 1901 — Sri Lanka
 Thelcticopis humilithorax Simon, 1910 — Congo
 Thelcticopis huyoplata Barrion & Litsinger, 1995 — Philippines
 Thelcticopis insularis Karsch, 1881 — Micronesia
 Thelcticopis kaparanganensis Barrion & Litsinger, 1995 — Philippines
 Thelcticopis karnyi Reimoser, 1929 — Sumatra
 Thelcticopis kianganensis Barrion & Litsinger, 1995 — Philippines
 Thelcticopis kirankhalapi Ahmed et al., 2015 — India
 Thelcticopis klossi Reimoser, 1929 — Sumatra
 Thelcticopis luctuosa Doleschall, 1859 — Java
 Thelcticopis maindroni Simon, 1906 — India
 Thelcticopis modesta Thorell, 1890 — Malaysia
 Thelcticopis moesta Doleschall, 1859 — Amboina
 Thelcticopis moolampilliensis Jose & Sebastian, 2007 — India
 Thelcticopis nigrocephala Merian, 1911 — Sulawesi
 Thelcticopis ochracea Pocock, 1899 — New Britain
 Thelcticopis orichalcea Simon, 1880 — Sumatra, Borneo
 Thelcticopis papuana Simon, 1880 — New Guinea
 Thelcticopis pennata Simon, 1901 — Malaysia
 Thelcticopis picta Thorell, 1887 — Myanmar
 Thelcticopis pinmini (Cai & Zhong, 2021) — China
 Thelcticopis quadrimunita Strand, 1911 — New Guinea
 Thelcticopis rubristernis Strand, 1911 — Aru Islands
 Thelcticopis rufula Pocock, 1901 — India
 Thelcticopis sagittata Hogg, 1915 — New Guinea
 Thelcticopis salomonum Strand, 1913 — Solomon Islands
 Thelcticopis scaura Simon, 1910 — São Tomé
 Thelcticopis serambiformis Strand, 1907 — India
 Thelcticopis severa L. Koch, 1875 — China, Laos, Korea, Japan
 Thelcticopis simplerta Barrion & Litsinger, 1995 — Philippines
 Thelcticopis telonotata Dyal, 1935 — Pakistan
 Thelcticopis truculenta Karsch, 1884 — São Tomé, Principe
 Thelcticopis unciformis (Zhu & Zhong, 2020) — Taiwan
 Thelcticopis vasta L. Koch, 1873 — Fiji
 Thelcticopis virescens Pocock, 1901 — India
 Thelcticopis zhengi Liu, Li & Jäger, 2010  — China

References

Further reading
 Reimoser, E. (1929). Spolia Mentawiensa: Araneae. The Bulletin of the Raffles Museum 2:125-133 PDF (description of T. klossi and T. karnyi)

External links

Spiders of Asia
Spiders of Africa
Spiders of Central America
Sparassidae
Araneomorphae genera